Daystar Swift (born 7 December 1991) is a Trinidadian netball player who plays for Trinidad and Tobago in the positions of goal keeper or goal defense. She has featured for the national side in two World Cup tournaments in 2015 and in 2019. She has also represented Trinidad and Tobago at the 2014 Commonwealth Games. She joined Northern Stars for the 2020 ANZ Premiership season.

References 

1991 births
Living people
Trinidad and Tobago netball players
Netball players at the 2014 Commonwealth Games
Commonwealth Games competitors for Trinidad and Tobago
Northern Stars players
2019 Netball World Cup players
Trinidad and Tobago expatriate sportspeople in New Zealand
ANZ Premiership players